Questprobe is a trilogy of graphical adventure video games featuring Marvel Comics characters. The three games are Questprobe featuring The Hulk, Questprobe featuring Spider-Man and Questprobe featuring Human Torch and Thing.

History
In 1983, Marvel Comics searched for a licensee for use of its characters in a home computer game, and approached Adventure International; its founder and CEO Scott Adams was interested in the venture as an avid reader of Marvel since his childhood, and the two parties agreed to a contract on December 1, 1983. Marvel's ten-year license for Adventure's use of its characters was Marvel's first long-term license, as well as Adventure's first use of licensed characters. Adams, given unlimited freedom in creating the games, spent an afternoon coordinating a rough overview of the series with Marvel writer John Byrne, and Bob Budiansky would oversee the entire project. The series title came from Adams's attempt to formulate a title that would indicate the player's involvement in a search. The Hulk was selected as the star of the first installment because of his widespread recognition among general audiences, and the game would be the Hulk's first appearance within the medium. Questprobe featuring The Hulk was released on May 1, 1984, for the Acorn Electron, Apple II series, Atari 8-bit family, BBC Micro, Commodore 64, Dragon 32, IBM PC DOS, and ZX Spectrum. The game's release was accompanied by a comic similarly titled Questprobe, with the first issue centering on the Hulk being tricked into saving a doomed planet. Because wholesalers had no provisions for distributing comics, Adventure International decided to reduce the size of subsequent issues in order to package the comics along with the games.

In January 1985, Adams revealed that he was developing a second Questprobe game with Al Milgrom based on Spider-Man, and disclosed plans to release a new game every three to five months, with a projected total of twelve or thirteen games. Subsequent games involving Human Torch and Captain America were planned at the time, as were potential games showcasing Iron Man and a villain character.

Cancelled X-Men game
The fourth title in the series was to include the X-Men. This game was partly coded by Scott Adams but never saw the light of day as a published game, as Adventure International became bankrupt during its development in 1986.

Comic book tie-ins
A Questprobe comic book tie-in was also released. Originally intended as a 12-issue miniseries, this series was canceled after issue #3 (November 1985) due to Adventure International's bankruptcy. The story intended for issue #4, featuring the X-Men, was published in Marvel Fanfare #33 (July 1987).<ref>[http://www.comics.org/issue/43105/ Marvel Fanfare #33] at the Grand Comics Database</ref>
The events of the Questprobe comic book were later followed up on in the Quasar series. The Chief Examiner from the game and comics received an entry in the Official Handbook of the Marvel Universe Deluxe Edition'' #2 (January 1986).

References

External links
 
 Questprobe series at Universal Videogame List
 Questprobe series at the IFDB

1980s interactive fiction
Adventure International games
Defunct American comics
Interactive fiction based on works
Marvel Comics storylines
Single-player video games
Video game franchises introduced in 1984
Video games based on Marvel Comics